DHT may refer to:

Science and technology
 Discrete Hartley transform, in mathematics
 Distributed hash table, lookup service in computing

Chemistry
Dihydrotestosterone, hormone derived from testosterone
Dihydrotachysterol, synthetic vitamin D analog

Other
 DHT (band), Belgian dance duo
 Dr Hadwen Trust, UK charity promoting animal experiments alternatives
 Dalhart Municipal Airport, (IATA code), an airport near Dalhart, Texas
 Grande Prairie Daily Herald-Tribune, a newspaper in Canada
 David Hume Tower, the former name of 40 George Square, a University of Edinburgh building

See also